The women's marathon 10 kilometre event at the 2008 Olympic Games took place on 20 August at the Shunyi Olympic Rowing-Canoeing Park in Beijing, China.

Russia's Larisa Ilchenko sprinted to a top finish in the final stages. With only 150 metres left, she put in a late charge to overhaul the British duo Keri-Anne Payne and Cassandra Patten on the right side of the pack, and slapped the yellow pads to capture the gold in a sterling time of 1:59:27.7. Payne trailed behind Ilchenko by exactly half a second (0.50), but powered home with a silver in 1:59:29.2, while Patten snatched the bronze in 1:59:31.0 to hold off a grueling battle from Germany's Angela Maurer (1:59:31.9) by almost a full second.

Netherlands' two-time world champion Edith van Dijk earned a fourteenth spot in 2:00:02.8, while South Africa's Natalie du Toit, the first ever amputee in history to compete at the Olympics, enjoyed the race of her life as she finished with a highly respectable, sixteenth-place effort in 2:00:49.9. A member of the nation's swim team, she lost her leg below the knee from a motor scooter accident in 2001.

Qualification
The women's 10 km races at the 2008 Olympics featured a field of twenty-five swimmers:
 10: the top-10 finishers in the 10 km races at the 2008 FINA World Championships in Seville, Spain. 
 9: the top-9 finishers at the Good Luck Beijing Olympic 10K Marathon Test Event (31 May–1 June 2008 in Beijing, China). 
 5: one representative from each FINA continent (Africa, Americas, Asia, Europe and Oceania). (These were selected based on the finishes at the World Championships.)
 1: from the host nation (China) if not qualified by other means.

Competition format
Unlike all of the other swimming events in the pool, the men's and women's marathon 10 kilometre races were held in open water. No preliminary heats were held, with only the single mass-start race being contested. This race is held using freestyle swimming, with a lack of stroke regulations. For most of the event swimmers use the front crawl, but modifications are used situationally, especially when swimmers reach feeding stations.

Open water swimming events require different tactics and showcase several different racing strategies that are more common to competitive cycling, marathon running and water polo than traditional pool swimming. It is one of the few Olympic sports where the athlete's coaches play a critical role during the actual event. The coaches have four opportunities to provide drinks to their athletes as the athletes swim by floating pontoons in the course.  If the coach falls in the water, his or her athlete is immediately disqualified.

Results

References

External links
Official Olympic Report

Women's marathon 10 kilometre
Olympics
2008 in women's swimming
Women's events at the 2008 Summer Olympics